This is a list of  video games. Throughout the years, hundreds of games were released exclusively in Japan for several consoles. A few were released outside Japan.

Sega SG-1000
 Serizawa Yadan no Tsume Shogi - 1983

Super Cassette Vision
 Shogi Nyuumon - 1985

Sharp X68000
 Morita Shogi II - 1989
 Shogi Seiten - 1992

MSX
 Naitou Kunio no Yume Shogi - 1984
 MSX Shogi - 1985
 Shogi Kyou - 1985
 Shogi Meijin - 1985
 Shogi - 1985
 Gunjin Shogi Gunshin Mars - 1986
 Tanigawa Kouji no Shogi Shinan - 1986
 Shogi - 1986
 Kisei - 1987
 Tanigawa Kouji no Shogi Shinan II - 1988
 Gunjin Shogi - 1988

Arcade
 Shogi (Alpha Denshi)
 Shogi no Tatsujin - 1995
 Tenakichi Shogi Kai 2 - 2011

Family Computer
 Honshogi: Naitou Kudan Shogi Hiden - 1985
 Morita Shogi - 1987
 Tanigawa Kouji no Shogi Shinan II: Meijin e no Michi - 1988
 Famicom Meijin Sen - 1988
 Tanigawa Kouji no Shogi Shinan III - 1989
 Kaettekita! Gunjin Shogi: Nanya Sore!? - 1989
 Famicom Shogi: Ryuu-Ou-Sen - 1991
 Shogi Meikan '92 - 1992
 Shogi Meikan '93 - 1992

Famicom Disk System
 Tanikawa Koji no Shogi Shinan II - 1987
 Tanigawa Kouji no Shogi Shinan II: Tsume no Shogi - 1988

Super Famicom
 Shodan Morita Shogi - 1991
 Super Shogi - 1992
 Hayazashi Nidan Morita Shogi - 1993
 Shogi Furinkazan - 1993
 BS Super Shogi Problem 1000 - 1994
 Itou Hatasu Mu-Dan no Shogi Dojo - 1994
 Super Shogi 2 - 1994
 Super Gomoku Shogi - 1994 (Nichibutsu)
 Super Tsume Shogi 1000 - 1994
 Honkaku Shogi: Fuuunji Ryuou - 1994
 Shogi Club - 1995
 Kousoku Shikou Shogi-Oh - 1995
 Habu Meijin no Omoshiro Shōgi - 1995 (Tomy Corporation)
 Saikousoku Shikou Shogi Mahjong - 1995
 Hayazashi Nidan Morita Shogi 2 - 1995
 4 Nin Shōgi - 1995 (Pow)
 Shogi Saikyou - 1995
 Kakinoki Shogi - 1995
 Shin Shogi Club - 1995
 Asahi Shinbun Rensai Katou Hifumi Kudan Shogi Shingiryuu - 1995 (Varie)
 Shogi Sanmai - 1995
 Super Shogi 3: Kitaihei - 1995
 Heisei Gunjin Shogi - 1996
 Shogi Saikyou II: Jissen Taikyoku Hen - 1996
 Pro Kishi Jinsei Simulation: Shōgi no Hanamichi - 1996 (Atlus)
 Table Game Daisyugo!! Shogi Mahjong Hanafuda - 1996 (Varie)
 Katou Hifumi Kudan Shogi Club - 1997

Panasonic 3DO
 Kakinoki Shogi - 1994
 AI Shogi - 1995

Neo Geo
 Shogi no Tatsujin - 1995

Neo Geo CD
 Shogi no Tatsujin - 1995

NeoGeo Pocket Color
 Shogi no Tatsujin - 1998
 Shogi no Tatsujin Color - 1999

Game Boy
 Shogi - 1989
 Tsume Shogi Mondai Teikyou: Shogi Sekai - 1994
 Tsume Shogi Hyakuban Shoubu - 1994
 Hon Shogi - 1994
 Shogi Saikyou - 1994
 Tsume Shogi Kamiki Godan - 1994
 Pocket Shogi - 1998

Game Boy Color
 Shogi Ou - 1998
 Katou Hifumi Kudan no Shogi Kyoushitsu - 1999
 Minna no Shogi: Shokyuuhen - 1999
 Shogi 2 - 1999
 Honkaku Taisen Shogi: Fu - 2000
 Taisen: Tsume Shogi - 2000
 Shogi 3 - 2001

Game Boy Advance
 Morita Shogi Advance - 2001
 Minna no Shogi - 2004

Turbo CD
 Shogi Database Kiyuu - 1995

PC Engine (TurboGrafx-16)
 Shogi Shodan Icchokusen - 1990
 Morita Shogi PC - 1991
 Shogi Shoshinsha Muyou - 1991

Sega Genesis
 Shogi no Hoshi - 1991

Sega Saturn
 Kakinoki Shogi - 1995
 Kanazawa Shogi - 1995
 Senryaku Shogi - 1995
 Shogi Matsuri - 1995
 AI Shogi - 1995
 Kiwamu II - 1996
 AI Shogi 2 - 1998
 Yoshimura Shogi - 1998
 Honkaku Shogi Shinan Wakamatsu Shougi Jyuku / Honkaku Shogi Yubinan - 1998 (SIMS)
 Mario Mushano no Chou-Shogi Juku - 1998

Nintendo 64
 Saikyō Habu Shōgi - 1996
 Morita Shogi 64 - 1998
 AI Shogi 3 - 1998

Nintendo DS
 Daredemo Asobi Taizen / 42 All-Time Classics / Clubhouse Games - 2005
 Appare! Shogi Jiisan - 2005
 Daredemo Kantan! Watanabe Akira no Tsume Shogi - 2006
 Itsu Demo Doko Demo Dekiru Shogi: AI Shogi DS - 2006
 Sekai no Shogi - 2007
 Saikyou Toudai Shogi DSi - 2007
 1500DS Spirits Vol. 2: Shogi - 2007
 Asonde Shogi ga Tsuyoku naru!! Ginsei Shogi DS - 2007
 Wi-Fi Taiou Morita Shogi DS - 2007
 1500DS Spirits: Shogi V - 2009
 at Shogi: Challenge Spirits - 2009
 Saikyou Gensei Shogi - 2009
 Habu Yoshiharu Shōgi de Kitaeru: Ketsudanryoku DS - 2009
 at Enta! Taisen Shogi 2 - 2010
 Hachi-One Diver DS: Naruzou-kun Hasami Shogi - 2010
 Shogi World Champion: Gekisashi DS - 2010
 Toudai Shogi: Meijinsen Dojo DS - 2011
 Ginsei Tsume Shogi - 2011

Nintendo Wii
 Saikyou Ginsei Shogi - 2008
 Tsuushin Taikyoku: Hayazashi Shogi Sandan - 2008

Nintendo 3DS
 Asonde Shogi Ga Tsuyokunaru! Ginsei Shogi DX - 2015

Nintendo Wii U
 Ginsei Shogi: Kyoutendo Toufuu Raijin - 2016

Nintendo Switch
 Ginsei Shogi: Kyoutendo Toufuu Raijin - 2017
 Asonde Shogi ga Tsuyoku Naru Ginsei Shogi DX - 2017
 Hifumi Katou-Supervised Hifumin’s Shogi Dojo - 2018
 Kanazawa Shogi ~ Level 300 ~ - 2018
 Dobutsu Shogi World - 2019
 Please Teach Me Onedari Shogi - 2019
 Clubhouse Games: 51 Worldwide Classics - 2020
 Kishi Fujii Souta no Shogi Training - 2020
 Kagawa Manao to Futari de Shogi - 2021

PlayStation
 Kakinoki Shogi - 1994
 Kiwame: Taikyoku Shogi - 1995
 Kanazawa Shogi '95 - 1995
 AI Shogi - 1995
 Senryaku Shogi - 1995
 Shogi Joryuu Meijin Kuraisen - 1995
 Kiwame Daidougi: Tsumuya Tsumazaruya - 1996
 AI Shogi 2 - 1997
 Katou Hifumi Kudan: Shogi Club - 1997
 Mario Mushano no Chou-Shogi-Juku - 1997
 I'Max Shogi II - 1997
 Morita Shogi - 1997
 Honkaku Shogi: Shogi O - 1998
 Yoshimura Shogi - 1998
 Kakinoki Shogi II - 1998
 Shogi Saikyou 2 - 1998
 The Shogi - 1998
 Saikyo Todai Shogi - 1998
 Saikyo Todai Shogi 2 - 1999
 Saikyou no Shogi - 1999
 Shogi Saikyou: Pro ni Manabu - 1999
 Tanaka Torahiko no Uru Tora Ryuu Shogi - 1999
 AI Shogi 2 Deluxe - 1999
 AI Shogi 2000 - 1999
 Shogi II - 1999
 Kanazawa Shogi Tsuki - 1999
 Morita Kazuo no Shogi Dojo - 1999
 The Shogi 2 - 2000
 0 Kara no Shogi: Shogi Youchien Ayumi Kumi R - 2000
 Kidou Senshi Gundam: The Gunjin Shogi - 2001
 Sekai Saikyou Ginsei Shogi - 2001
 Honkaku Shogi Shinan - 2001
 Family Shogi: Super Strong - 2002
 Minna no Shogi: Chuukyuuhen - 2002
 Minna no Shogi: Jokyuuhen - 2002
 Minna no Shogi: Shokyuuhen - 2002
 AI Shogi Selection - 2002
 Family Gunjin Shogi - 2002
 Saikyou Ginsei Shogi 2 - 2002

PlayStation 2
 Morita Shogi - 2000
 Kakinoki Shogi IV - 2000
 Toudai Shogi: Shikenbisha Dojo - 2000
 Choukousoku Shogi - 2001
 Kousoku Tanigawa Shogi - 2001
 Saikyou Toudai Shogi 3 - 2001
 Saikyou Toudai Shogi 4 - 2002
 Saikyou Toudai Shogi Special - 2002
 Internet Shogi - 2002
 The Shogi - 2002
 Shogi (PS2)|Shogi - 2003
 Saikyou Toudai Shogi 2003 - 2003
 Shogi World Champion Gekihashi 2 - 2003
 AI Shogi 2003 - 2003
 Shogi 4 - 2004
 Taisen(1) Shogi - 2004
 Saikyou Toudai Shogi 2004 - 2004
 Saikyou Toudai Shogi 5 - 2004
 Sekei Saikyou Ginsei Shogi 4 - 2004
 Toudai Shogi: Jouseki Dojo Kanketsuhen - 2004
 Saikyou Toudai Shogi Special II - 2005
 Saikyo Shogi Gekisashi Special - 2006
 Saikyou Toudai Shogi 6 - 2006

PlayStation 3
 Sekai Saikyou Ginsei Shogi: Fuuum Ryouko Raiden - 2011
 Saikyou Ginsei Shogi 7 - TBA
 Shogi World Champion Gekisashi (working title) - TBA
 Value 2000 Shogi - TBA

PlayStation Portable
 AI Shogi - 2005
 Saikyou Toudai Shogi Portable - 2005
 Isshou Asoberu Todai Shogi: Sakidzume Shogi Dojo - 2007
 Shogi ga Tsuyokunaru: Gekishi - Jouseki Dojo - 2007
 Saikyou Shogi Bonanza - 2008
 Saikyou Toudai Shogi Deluxe - 2009
 Shogi (PSP)|Shogi - 2010
 The Shogi - 2010
 Ginsei Shogi Portable - 2010
 Toudai Shogi: Mejinsen Dojo - 2010
 Shogi World Champion: Gekisashi Portable - 2010

PlayStation Vita
 Ginsei Shogi: Kyoutendo Toufuu Raijin - 2012

Dreamcast
 Tanaka Torahiko no Uru Toraryuu Shogi - 1999
 Morita no Saikyou Shogi - 1999
 Net Versus Shogi - 2001

PC
 Buruge Teki Datsui Shogi - 2001
 Shotest Shogi - 2008
 AI Shogi Version 16 for Windows - 2008
 IT Shogi - 2009
 Sekai Saikyou Ginsei Shogi 8 - 2009
 AI Shogi Version 17 for Windows - 2009
 Korekara wa Hajimeru no Tame no Shogi - 2009
 Motto Ue o Mezasu Jin no Tame no Shogi - 2009
 Shin Toudai Shogi Musou 2 - 2009
 Shogi Revolution: Gekisashi 9 - 2009
 AI Shogi Gold 2 - 2009
 AI Shogi Gold 3 - 2010
 Sekai Saikyou Ginsei Shogi 7 New Standard - 2010
 Sekai Saikyou Ginsei Shogi 9: Kazagumo Fuuun Ryuuko - 2010
 Ginsei Shogi Premium - 2010
 Shogi World Champion Gekisashi 10 - 2010
 Sekai Saikyou Ginsei Shogi 8: New Standard - 2011
 AI Shogi Version 18 for Windows - 2011
 GNU Shogi

NEC PC98
 Morita Kazuro no Shogi - 1985
 Dennou Shogi: Noboru Ryuu 2 - 1991

Xbox
 Yonenaga Kunio no Shogi Seminar - 2002

Xbox 360
 Shotest Shogi - 2008

iPhone/iPod
 5x5 Shogi - 2008
 Kakinoki Shogi - 2008
 IT Gunjin Shogi - 2009
 IT Shogi - 2009
 Shogi Z - 2009
 Ginsei Shogi - 2010
 Gunjin shogi: First - 2010
 Hasami Shogi - 2010
 Kakinoki Shogi for iPad - 2010
 Bonanza (shogi)|Bonanza - 2010
 Bonanza HD - 2010
 Morita Shogi HD - 2010
 Shogi Lv.100 - 2010
 Shogi Lv.100 for iPad (Japanese Chess) - 2010
 Shogi Live - 2010
 Shogi Z XL: Japanese Chess - 2011
 hi Gunjin Shogi - 2011
 i HABU Shogi - 2011

Mac OS X
 Shogi Demon - 2006

Android
 Shogi Lv.100 Lite (JPN Chess) - 2011
 Animal Shogi - 2012
 Kanasawa Shogi
 Shogi Wars

Bandai Pippin
 AI Shogi - 1996

WonderSwan
 Shogi Toryuumon - 1999
 Morita Shogi for WonderSwan - 1999

See also
 List of shogi software

References
 Shogi (Super Famicom games) at superfamicom.org

 
 
Video game lists by genre